South Fort Myers High School is a high school in Southern Fort Myers, Florida that is part of the Lee County School District.

Dual enrollment
Dual Enrollment & Early College Admissions: Students have the opportunity to take advantage of taking credit–granting college classes at Florida SouthWestern State College and Florida Gulf Coast University.

Academies
Medical
Public Service
 Construction
 Digital Design
Manufacturing and Engineering Technology 
Business and Informational Technology.
TV Production 
Agriscience 
Veterinary 
Criminal Justice
Military Science/Leadership (JROTC)

Notable alumni
 Sammy Watkins - Wide Receiver for Green Bay Packers.
 Jayron Kearse - Safety for Dallas Cowboys.

References 

Educational institutions established in 2005
Public high schools in Florida
High schools in Lee County, Florida
2005 establishments in Florida